The 2007–08 Scottish Cup was the 123rd season of Scotland's most prestigious football knockout competition.  The winners were Rangers, who defeated Queen of the South in the final.

The 2007–08 tournament saw a change in structure for the tournament with the admission of 4 members of the Scottish Junior Football Association to the first round.

Calendar

First round
Edinburgh University were given a random bye to the 2nd round. This was because only three Scottish Junior Football Association clubs entered, due to Linlithgow Rose winning both the East League and the Scottish Junior Cup and there being no mechanism allowing for runners-up to enter.

Keith, Inverurie Loco Works, Annan Athletic and Threave Rovers all received automatic byes into the 2nd round, due to being respectively: Highland Football League winners and runners-up, East of Scotland Football League winners and South of Scotland Football League winners during 2006–07 season.

Source: ESPN Soccernet

Replays

Source: ESPN Soccernet

Second round

Source: ESPN Soccernet

Replays

Source: ESPN Soccernet

Third round

Source: ESPN Soccernet

Replays

Source: ESPN Soccernet

Fourth round

Source: ESPN Soccernet

Replays

Source: ESPN Soccernet

Fifth round

Replays

Quarter-finals

Replays

Semi-finals

Final

Media coverage
 Domestically, both Sky Sports and BBC Sport Scotland broadcast selected live games, with both showing the final. Both also carry highlights of all games in every round.
 BBC Radio Scotland has exclusive domestic radio rights to the tournament.
 Through the SFA's international media partner IMG, the Scottish Cup is broadcast in various territories around the world. In Australia, for example, the Scottish Cup is currently available on Setanta Sports.

Scottish Cup seasons
Scottish Cup, 2007-08
Scot